All or Nothing is a 2008 studio album by South African rock band Prime Circle. The album was released on 24 June 2008 under EMI Music South Africa. The album was released internationally along with the All or Nothing Live DVD in 2009. Most of the album was written by the lead singer, Ross Learmonth and bass player Marco Gomes. The album received worldwide recognition and spawned hits such as "She Always Gets What She Wants" and "Consider Me".

Track listing

Special Edition DVD Tracks

DVD Extras 

Photo gallery
"Out Of This Place" (Music Video)
"She Always Gets What She Wants" (Music Video)
All Or Nothing EPK (The making of, documentary)
"She Always Gets What She Wants"
"Live This Life"

Inspiration 

The Band is inspired by their day-to-day life .

Personnel 

Ross Learmoth - vocals, rhythm guitar
Dale Schnettler - drums, backing vocals
Marco Gomes - bass
Dirk Bisschoff - lead guitar
Neil Breytenbach - keyboards

Notes and references 

Prime Circle albums
2008 albums